Simon Scarrow (born 3 October 1962) is a British author. Scarrow completed a master's degree at the University of East Anglia after working at the Inland Revenue, and then went into teaching as a lecturer, firstly at East Norfolk Sixth Form College, then at City College Norwich. Simon is a patron of the Bansang Hospital Appeal which supports an outstandingly innovative hospital in The Gambia.

He is best known for his Eagles of the Empire series of Roman military fiction set in the territories of the Roman Empire, covering the second invasion of Britain and the subsequent prolonged campaign undertaken by the rump of the Julio-Claudian dynasty. As of March 2023, there are 22 books in the series; the latest, "Rebellion", was published in 2023 

He has also written another series, Revolution, focusing on Wellington and Napoleon, whose first title, Young Bloods, was published in 2006. The second volume, The Generals, was released on 31 May 2007 and the third volume Fire and Sword was released in January 2009. The fourth and final novel of the series was released in Jun 2010 and is called The Fields of Death. He began publishing a new series in 2011 titled Gladiator.

Books
The last fifteen of Scarrow's novels have been Sunday Times bestsellers. His works have been translated into over twenty languages and have sold several million copies. He has been awarded two prizes for his fiction and counts the King of Jordan as one of his fans.

Asked by the Edinburgh Book Review about the inspiration behind his interest in the Roman era, Scarrow said, "Firstly, great Latin teachers – Gordon Rodway and then Reg Nash, who inspired a love of the language and more enduringly a fascination with Roman history and culture. Secondly, when I was growing up in the seventies swords and sandals epics seemed to be on the TV regularly. Not to mention the brilliant I, Claudius".

Scarrow cites the inspiration for his 'earthy' characters as being from his time in the Officer Training Corps.

Eagles of the Empire series
The Eagles of the Empire series centres upon two main protagonists, Quintus Licinius Cato and Lucius Cornelius Macro, who are both Roman soldiers. Macro, a veteran with nearly 15 years' service (at the start of the first novel) in the Roman Army, has recently been appointed to the Centurionate. Cato is in his teen years, grew up in the Imperial Palace as a slave, and at the start of the series joins the Eagles as Macro's Optio. The first book starts in 42 AD. The books cover the experiences of the two soldiers, initially as experienced centurion and new optio, in battles in Germania and the invasion of Britain by Claudius as part of the Legio II Augusta. The 6th book The Eagle's Prophecy has them serving as part of the Imperial Navy east of Italy. The 7th and 8th put them in Rome's eastern provinces as agents of the Emperor's secretary Tiberius Claudius Narcissus. The 9th sees them shipwrecked on the island of Crete, fighting against a full-scale uprising. The 11th is set in Rome with the leads hoping to save the emperor from the shady Liberators. The Blood Crows is set once again in Britannia. The two protagonists are faced with defeating tribal rebels.

The two characters Cato and Macro were additionally used in one book of the TimeRiders series: Gates of Rome. They served as supporting characters when the three protagonists travel back to ancient Rome. Scarrow allowed his brother Alex to make use of the characters in his novel.

In 2007 the publisher announced the intention to cease using the word "Eagle" in the title of books in this series, starting with Centurion. The change was apparently because the publisher wanted to attract more new readers to the series.

Under the Eagle (2000)
The Eagle's Conquest (2001)
When the Eagle Hunts (2002)
The Eagle and the Wolves (2003)
The Eagle's Prey (2004)
The Eagle's Prophecy (2005)
The Eagle in the Sand (2006)
Centurion (2007)
The Gladiator (2009)
The Legion (2010)
Blood Debt (2009, short story)
Praetorian (2011)
The Blood Crows (2013)
Brothers in Blood (2014)
Britannia (2015)
Invictus (2016)
Day of the Caesars (2017)
The Blood of Rome (2018)
Traitors of Rome (2019)
The Emperor's Exile (2020)
The Honour of Rome (2021)
Death to the Emperor (2022)

Revolution series
The Revolution Quartet centres upon the lives of Napoleon Bonaparte and Arthur Wellesley, later the Duke of Wellington. The first book in the quartet starts in 1769, and follows the two young men through their youth and on to their military careers.

Young Bloods (2006)
The Generals (2007)
Fire and Sword (2009)
The Fields of Death (2010)

Gladiator series
The Gladiator series is aimed at the young adult audience, unlike his Eagle series.

 Gladiator: Fight for Freedom (2011)
 Gladiator: Street Fighter (2012)
 Gladiator: Son of Spartacus (2013)
 Gladiator: Vengeance (2014)

Roman Arena series (with T. J. Andrews)
Also acts as something of a prequel to the Eagle series as it features an earlier appearance of both characters Macro and Narcissus.
Arena (2013)
 Barbarian (2012)
 Challenger (2012)
 First Sword (2013)
 Revenge (2013)
 Champion (2013)
n.b. these novellas were available as e-books prior to publication of the full title.

Invader series (with T. J. Andrews)
Invader (2016)
Death Beach (2014)
Blood Enemy (2014)
Dark Blade (2014)
Imperial Agent (2015)
Sacrifice (2015)
n.b. these novellas were available as e-books prior to publication of the full title.

Pirata series (with T. J. Andrews)
Pirata (2019)
The Black Flag (2019)
The Gates of Stone (2019)
Hunters of the Sea (2019)
Sea of Blood (2019)
The Pirate Chief (2019)
n.b. these novellas were available as e-books prior to publication of the full title.

Roman Caratacus series (with T. J. Andrews)
Warrior (forthcoming 2023)
The King in Rome (2022)
The Druids' Lair (2022)
Brothers of the Sword (forthcoming 2023)
The War Prince (forthcoming 2023)
Lord of War (forthcoming 2023)
n.b. these novellas were available as e-books prior to publication of the full title.

Stand-alone novels
The following are books which are either stand-alone novels or have yet to be confirmed as parts of a series.

The Sword and the Scimitar (2012) -- covers the Great Siege of Malta

Hearts of Stone (2015) -- covers WWII period Greek island of Lefkas

Playing With Death with Lee Francis (2018) -- Crime story

Blackout -- covers WWII period Germany

Writer in Residence
In November 2006, Simon Scarrow was accepted to fill the post of Writer in Residence at Simon Langton Grammar School for Boys, a position he said he was "honoured to accept".

Personal life
Simon lives in Norfolk with his wife Louise and their dog ‘BB’ (named after BB Glazer, the ferocious agent in the TV series Frasier).  Besides writing, Simon gives talks on history and writing at festivals. His leisure interests include skiing and scuba diving.

References

External links
  (Scarrow brothers Alex and Simon)
 Simon Scarrow at Facebook
 

1962 births
English historical novelists
Writers of historical mysteries
Writers of historical fiction set in antiquity
Alumni of the University of East Anglia
People educated at Kent College
Living people
Place of birth missing (living people)